Royal Consort Gwi-in of the Pungyang Jo clan (귀인 조씨) (1842 – 1865) was a concubine of King Cheoljong of Joseon.

Biography
Lady Gwi-in came from the Pungyang Jo clan. At the age of 17 (the 10th year of King Cheoljong's reign), she entered the palace as a gungnyeo (궁인). On February 22, 1859, she became a concubine of the Gwi-in (귀인) rank, and her first son, who died soon after birth, was born on November 7, 1859. On January 15, 1861, she gave birth to another prince.

Lady Jo died in 1865 (the 2nd year of Emperor Gojong's reign), at the age of 24, and the funeral rites were held at the residence of her father-in-law, Grand Internal Prince Jeongye. Her tomb was initially located in Pocheon, Gyeonggi Province, but was later moved to the Seosamneung Cluster, in Goyang.

Popular culture
She was portrayed by Seol In-ah in the 2020 TV series Mr. Queen.

References 

1842 births
1865 deaths
Royal consorts of the Joseon dynasty